The Longanus (also Longanos or Loitanus) was a river in north-eastern Sicily on the Mylaean plain. As recorded by Polybius, it was where the Mamertines were drastically defeated by Hiero II of Syracuse in around 269 BC. The small settlement of Longane was near it. The river was considered so important that it was represented as a God in coins. Some archeologists identify it with the river that arises in the valley of Fondachelli-Fantina town called Patrì  or Fantina.

References

Rivers of Italy
Rivers of Sicily
Former rivers